Prisoners in Paradise  is the fifth studio album by the Swedish rock band Europe. It was released on 23 September 1991, by Epic Records and spawned hits such as the title track, "Prisoners in Paradise" and "I'll Cry for You". The album did not chart in the US, which is unusual for a major label follow-up to two recent (multi)platinum albums. Prisoners in Paradise is the last album to feature guitarist Kee Marcello.

The band's guitarist Kee Marcello states in his 2011 biography that Bob Rock was the first choice for producer for this album, and agreed initially but pulled out to work on Metallica´s eponymous album instead. The large number of finished bonus tracks is also explained in this book: the first version of this album, called "Seventh Sign" was rejected by the label in 1990 and the band had to write and record new songs. Five more tracks were demoed in addition to the 25 listed below; two of them were rewritten and became "New Love in Town" on Last Look at Eden and "Bring it All Home" on Bag of Bones. Most of the unreleased songs down below can be found on YouTube as demo recordings. Two of the previously unreleased tracks, "Wild Child" and "I Don't Know How to Love No More" were re-recorded for Kee Marcello's 2016 solo album "Scaling Up" on Frontiers Records.

Track listing

(Note: These unreleased demos can, for some reason, be heard on YouTube and, thusly, accurate time lengths for these songs were acquired.)

Personnel

Europe
Joey Tempest – lead vocals, acoustic guitars
Kee Marcello – electric guitars, background vocals
John Levén – bass guitar
Mic Michaeli – keyboards, background vocals
Ian Haugland – drums

Additional musicians
Nate Winger, Paul Winger – background vocals

Production
Beau Hill – producer, mixing
Jimmy Hoyson – engineer, mixing
Martin Horenburg – assistant engineer
Ted Jensen – mastering
Jeff Katz – photography
Mark Wilkinson – illustrations
Tony Sellari – art direction

Charts

Album

Singles

Certifications

References 

Europe (band) albums
1991 albums
Epic Records albums
Albums produced by Beau Hill